Nils Höglander (born 20 December 2000) is a Swedish professional ice hockey left winger for the Abbotsford Canucks in the American Hockey League (AHL) while under contract to the Vancouver Canucks of the National Hockey League (NHL). He was selected in the second round, 40th overall, by the Canucks in the 2019 NHL Entry Draft.

He is also known for scoring two Michigan goals in two different matches in the SHL, thus claiming the SHL Goal of the Year twice.

Playing career
On 30 April 2020, Höglander signed a three-year, entry-level contract with the Vancouver Canucks. With the 2020–21 North American season delayed due to the COVID-19 pandemic, Höglander was returned to begin the season on loan to Rögle BK of the SHL, until the resumption of NHL training camp in January.

Höglander made his NHL debut and scored his first NHL goal on 13 January 2021, in the Canucks' season opener against Mikko Koskinen of the Edmonton Oilers. On 18 May 2021, Höglander was awarded the Pavel Bure Most Exciting Player Award for most exciting player on the Canucks as voted by the fans.

Career statistics

Regular season and playoffs

International

References

External links
 

2000 births
Living people
Abbotsford Canucks players
AIK IF players
People from Sorsele Municipality
Rögle BK players
Swedish ice hockey left wingers
Vancouver Canucks draft picks
Vancouver Canucks players
Sportspeople from Västerbotten County